The Layon is a  long river in the Deux-Sèvres and Maine-et-Loire departments in western France. Its source is near Saint-Maurice-la-Fougereuse. It flows generally northwest. It is a left tributary of the Loire, into which it flows near Chalonnes-sur-Loire.

Departments and communes along its course
This list is ordered from source to mouth: 
Deux-Sèvres: Saint-Maurice-la-Fougereuse, Genneton
Maine-et-Loire: Cléré-sur-Layon, Passavant-sur-Layon, Nueil-sur-Layon, Les Verchers-sur-Layon, Concourson-sur-Layon, Saint-Georges-sur-Layon, Brigné, Martigné-Briand, Tigné, Aubigné-sur-Layon, Faveraye-Mâchelles, Thouarcé, Faye-d'Anjou, Champ-sur-Layon, Rablay-sur-Layon, Chanzeaux, Beaulieu-sur-Layon, Saint-Lambert-du-Lattay, Rochefort-sur-Loire, Saint-Aubin-de-Luigné, Chaudefonds-sur-Layon, Chalonnes-sur-Loire

References

Rivers of France
Rivers of Nouvelle-Aquitaine
Rivers of Pays de la Loire
Rivers of Deux-Sèvres
Rivers of Maine-et-Loire